Impfondo is a town in the northeastern Republic of the Congo with a population of around 41,000 people, lying on the Oubangui River. It is home to an airport and is linked by river barge to Brazzaville and to Bangui. It is the administrative centre of Impfondo District and the Likouala Region.

Historically called Desbordesville, Impfondo is usually a stopping point on the way to Bangui by barge. It is a frontier kind of place, the last vestige of what could be called civilisation in an area overwhelmed by dense forest swamps and small villages. Rumours abound of a police force and sets of soldiers more corrupt than in other parts of the Congo, probably due to its remoteness, in addition to being so close to the Democratic Republic of Congo over the river. Soldiers from DR Congo have been known to cross and harass the population on occasion, making people here more on edge than usual. The entire western side of the Congo River in the Likouala is also home to refugee camps, though as the conflict in DR Congo subsides, they should be making their way back across the river.

To the west of Impfondo lies the Lac Tele area of the tropical jungle. This area is one of the least developed regions of Africa, with stretches of barely touched equatorial rain-forest and wetlands stretching for hundreds of kilometres in every direction. The footprint of civilisation is small, and in some ways threaten to disappear altogether - with barely existent dirt roads connecting small villages with the addition of the looming presence of Ebola epidemics. Wilderness and animal concerns take precedence over the daily lives of people, and by some accounts, the Congo's north is the 'last great wilderness of Africa'.

Large animals are still found across the area, including lowland gorillas, hippopotamus, forest elephants, crocodiles and numerous monkeys. The wetlands are also home to several hundred bird species, numerous snake species, and many as-yet-discovered aspects of the region.

There is a highly undeveloped dirt trail heading north from Impfondo along the river into the Central African Republic.

References

Likouala Department
Populated places in the Republic of the Congo
Ubangi River